The Appropriate Technology Library consists of 1050 books on 29 subject areas of small scale, do-it-yourself technology. Originally developed by Volunteers in Asia (VIA) it was transferred to Village Earth: The Consortium for Sustainable Village-Based Development in 1993.

The Library was developed to be a low-cost and portable source of appropriate technology information for aid and relief workers around the world. Since its inception, it has been used in dozens of countries around the world.

External links
 Village Earth: Appropriate Technology Library 

Do it yourself
Appropriate technology